WBUS (99.5 MHz) is the call sign for an FM radio station broadcasting in Centre Hall, Pennsylvania serving the State College, Pennsylvania area.

History
Originally on 94.5, the WLTS call sign and format moved to 99.5 while 94.5 became WBHV. 99.5 was originally a class A station licensed to the town of Mount Union using the call sign WXMJ (Magic 99.5). When purchased by Forever Broadcasting, the company applied for and was granted a change in the city of license to Centre Hall along with a change to a class B1 (25,000 watts equivalent) status. The transmitter site was moved to Tussey Mountain on the south side of State College.

On January 22, 2019, WMAJ-FM's CHR format moved to WBUS 93.7 FM Boalsburg, swapping frequencies with classic rock-formatted "The Bus" and the station assuming the WBUS call sign.

It was announced on October 12, 2022 that Forever Media is selling 34 stations, including WBUS and five other sister stations, to State College-based Seven Mountains Media for $17.3 million. The deal closed on January 2, 2023.

Previous logos

References

External links
Official website

BUS (FM)
Classic rock radio stations in the United States
Radio stations established in 1989
1989 establishments in Pennsylvania